Dubuisson is a French surname. Notable people with the surname include:

Jacques-Charles Renaud Dubuisson (1666–1739), career soldier, born in France, migrated to Canada in 1685
Jean Dubuisson (1914–2011), French architect
Pierre-Ulric Dubuisson (1746–1794), French actor, playwright and theatre director
Stephen Larigaudelle Dubuisson (1786–1864), French Jesuit priest who immigrated to the United States
Victor Dubuisson (born 1990), French professional golfer

French-language surnames